Giovanni della Croce Bernardotte, Spanishized with the name of Juan de la Cruz y Bernardotte (Genoa, 1693 - San Agustín de Talca, January 27, 1768), was a Genoese ship captain and explorer. It is the trunk of one of the most important colonial families of San Agustín de Talca due to many local advances.

Origin

He was a sailor in his early years. Juan de la Cruz joined the troops of King Felipe V. In Naples he was present at the coronation of Carlos III. He left for the Indies in the ship of San Esteban and attended the assault in Colonia del Sacramento, where the Portuguese took him prisoner. Having escaped, he returned to Spain, where he joined Admiral José Pizarro's squad who came to America to fight Admiral Anson's squad.

Arrival to the kingdom of Chile

Upon arriving in Concepción, he stayed in those lands where he was part of the retinue of the Count of Superunda, with whom he promised to found cities in the center of the Kingdom. He gathered people from the squad of Admiral Pizarro with whom they had some architectural knowledge to lead the Creoles in their constructions. Juan de la Cruz with the governor of the Kingdom passed to the foundation of the city of Talca. There he received one of the best lots and helped the Creoles build their houses.

In his manor house, whose construction he himself directed, consisted of 71 front bars per 100 sides. It had ten pieces and the house was made of tiles: "A flat iron window in the street, with its two doors made of boards of a high and medium wide bar, with its iron knockers." It had corridors of «carved pillars, main street door, which is two-leaf, with 150 bronze nails with its trascason and its shutter, and its key and tread plate, and its bronze accessories, three bars and five seams high and three wide, with a lobby, with its thresholds up and down with its cypress wood hinges ».

Family

He married Silveria Álvarez de Bahamonde y Herrera, a descendant of the first conquerors and first settlers of the Maule party, with whom he had 15 children: Faustino, Jacinto, Juan Esteban, Vicente, Juan Manuel, Ignacio, María de los Ángeles, Anselmo, Juan, María Mercedes, Bartolina, Micaela, María Rita, Manuela and Nicolás.

The noble neighbors considered Juan de la Cruz y Bernardotte as a good gentleman, despite being a foreigner. He made and put his entire person at the service of the neighborhood. He was benefactor of the Jesuits.

However, he was affected with the expulsion order of all foreigners residing in Chile. In 1763, the corregidor published an order, which ordered foreigners to leave the country in a short time. De la Cruz filed an application asking to be left because of his age, because he was then seventy years old, for his services and for being one of the first settlers. The corregidor consulted with the governor and ordered that De la Cruz remain in Talca.

It was the trunk of the main families that formed San Agustín de Talca. He gave all his children a good education of the Jesuits, at whose request he had made valuable donations. Among the teachers of his children was the famous abbot Juan Ignacio Molina, who was his great friend.

See also 
 Founding of Talca
 Condado de Maule
 History of Chile
 Cruz Family

References

External links 

O´ Higgins Family
Epistolary Cruz Family

1693 births
1768 deaths
18th-century Chilean people
 
Chilean families
Families of Genoa
Roman Catholic families
Italian emigrants to Chile